"Bad Moon Rising" is a 1969 song by Creedence Clearwater Revival.

Bad Moon Rising may also refer to:

Music
 Bad Moon Rising: The Best of Creedence Clearwater Revival, 2003 compilation album
 Bad Moon Rising (album), by Sonic Youth
 Bad Moon Rising (band), a hard rock band featuring Doug Aldrich

Television
 "Bad Moon Rising" (The Vampire Diaries), 2010 series episode
 "Bad Moon Rising" (Grimm), 2012 series episode 
 "Bad Moon Rising", series episode of The West Wing (season 2)
 "Bad Moon Rising", series episode of Everybody Loves Raymond (season 4)

Literature
 Bad Moon Rising: An Anthology of Political Forebodings, a science-fiction anthology edited by Thomas M. Disch
 Bad Moon Rising (Judge Dredd novel), a  novel by David Bishop
 "Bad Moon Rising", an issue of the comic-book series The Sandman, included in the collection The Sandman: A Game of You
 Bad Moon Rising, the last book in the Pine Deep Trilogy by Jonathan Maberry
 Bad Moon Rising, a book in Sherrilyn Kenyon's Dark-Hunter series
 Bad Moon Rising: How Reverend Moon Created the Washington Times, Seduced the Religious Right, and Built an American Kingdom by John Gorenfeld, a book by about Sun Myung Moon